"God of Thunder" is a song by Kiss from their 1976 album Destroyer. The song has also been featured on many of Kiss' live albums, including an up-tempo version on Alive II. Many various sound effects were used to make the song including explosions, clapping, zippers, overdubbed audience chatter and screaming children. The song was written by Paul Stanley, who intended to sing it on the album, but producer Bob Ezrin suggested slowing down the tempo and handing the lead vocals over to Gene Simmons.

Overview
The song is Simmons' "theme song" for the band. It has been performed live with blood-spitting, a bass solo, and a portion of the song being performed by Simmons on a high-rise above the audience.

Reception
"God of Thunder" is widely regarded as one of Kiss's best songs. In 2014, Paste ranked the song number 11 on their list of the 20 greatest Kiss songs, and in 2019, Louder Sound ranked the song number eight on their list of the 40 greatest Kiss songs.

Releases
Original studio version on Destroyer
Remixed studio version on Destroyer: Resurrected
Live version on Alive II
Live version on Gold
Alternate studio version on Kiss Killers
Alternate live version on Kiss Symphony: Alive IV
Remastered version on Double Platinum
Another live version on Kiss Alive! 1975-2000 (Best Buy exclusive track)
Original demo version sung by Paul Stanley on The Box Set
Original demo version sung by Paul Stanley on Kiss 40
Unplugged country version on Kissology Volume Three

Personnel
Kiss
Gene Simmons – bass, lead vocals
Peter Criss – drums
Paul Stanley – rhythm guitar
Ace Frehley – lead guitar

Additional personnel
Bob Ezrin – keyboards, sound effects
David Ezrin – voices
Josh Ezrin – voices

References

Kiss (band) songs
1976 singles
Song recordings produced by Bob Ezrin
Songs written by Paul Stanley